John David Barrow  (29 November 1952 – 26 September 2020) was an English cosmologist, theoretical physicist, and mathematician. He served as Gresham Professor of Geometry at Gresham College from 2008 to 2011. Barrow was also a writer of popular science and an amateur playwright.

Education
Barrow attended Barham Primary School in Wembley until 1964 and Ealing Grammar School for Boys from 1964 to 1971 and obtained his first degree in mathematics and physics from Van Mildert College at the University of Durham in 1974. In 1977, he completed his doctorate in astrophysics at Magdalen College, Oxford, supervised by Dennis William Sciama.

Career and research
Barrow was a Junior Research Lecturer at Christ Church, Oxford, from 1977 to 1981. He completed two postdoctoral years as a Miller Research Fellow in astronomy at the University of California, Berkeley, as a Commonwealth Lindemann Fellow (1977–8) and Miller Fellow (1980–1).

In 1981 he joined the University of Sussex and rose to become Professor and Director of the Astronomy Centre. In 1999, he became Professor in the Department of Applied Mathematics and Theoretical Physics and a fellow in Clare Hall at Cambridge University. From 2003 to 2007 he was Gresham Professor of Astronomy at Gresham College, London, and he was appointed as Gresham Professor of Geometry from 2008 to 2011; only one person has previously held two different Gresham chairs. 

From 1999, he directed the Millennium Mathematics Project (MMP) at the University of Cambridge. This is an outreach and education programme to improve the appreciation, teaching and learning of mathematics and its applications. In 2006 it was awarded the Queen's Anniversary Prize for Educational Achievement by Queen Elizabeth II at Buckingham Palace.

In addition to having published more than 500 journal articles, Barrow co-wrote (with Frank J. Tipler) The Anthropic Cosmological Principle, a work on the history of the ideas, specifically intelligent design and teleology, as well as a treatise on astrophysics. He also published 22 books for general readers, beginning with his 1983 The Left Hand of Creation. His books summarise the state of the affairs of physical questions, often in the form of compendia of a large number of facts assembled from the works of great physicists, such as Paul Dirac and Arthur Eddington.

Barrow's approach to philosophical issues posed by physical cosmology made his books accessible to general readers. For example, Barrow introduced a memorable paradox, which he called "the Groucho Marx Effect" (see Russell-like paradoxes). Here, he quotes Groucho Marx: "I wouldn't want to belong to any club that would accept me as a member". Applying this to problems in cosmology, Barrow stated: "A universe simple enough to be understood is too simple to produce a mind capable of understanding it".  

Barrow lectured at 10 Downing Street, Windsor Castle, and the Vatican, as well as to the general public. In 2002, his play Infinities premiered in Milan, played in Valencia, and won the Premi Ubu 2002 Italian Theatre Prize.

Honours
Barrow was awarded the 2006 Templeton Prize for "Progress Toward Research or Discoveries about Spiritual Realities" for his "writings about the relationship between life and the universe, and the nature of human understanding [which] have created new perspectives on questions of ultimate concern to science and religion". He was a member of a United Reformed Church, which he described as teaching "a traditional deistic picture of the universe".

In 2008, the Royal Society awarded him the Faraday Prize. He was elected a Fellow of the Royal Society (London) in 2003 and elected Fellow of the Academia Europaea in 2009. He has received Honorary Doctorates from the Universities of Hertfordshire, Sussex, Durham, South Wales, and Szczecin, and was an Honorary Professor at the University of Nanjing. He was an Honorary Fellow of Van Mildert College (Durham University) and of Gresham College (London). He was a Centenary Gifford Lecturer at the University of Glasgow in 1989.

He was awarded the Dirac Prize and Gold Medal of the Institute of Physics in 2015 and the Gold Medal of the Royal Astronomical Society in 2016.

Death
Barrow died on 26 September 2020 from colon cancer, at the age of 67.

Publications

In English:
 The Left Hand of Creation: The Origin and Evolution of the Expanding Universe, Barrow J., and Joseph Silk, Oxford UP, 1983
 Between Inner Space and Outer Space: Essays on the Science, Art, and Philosophy of the Origin of the Universe
 Impossibility: Limits of Science and the Science of Limits.  
 Material Content of the Universe
 Pi in the Sky: Counting, Thinking, and Being. Oxford University Press, 1992, 
 Science and Ultimate Reality: Quantum Theory, Cosmology and Complexity
 
 The Artful Universe: The Cosmic Source of Human Creativity. OUP, 1995, . Expanded 2005, 
 The Book of Nothing: Vacuums, Voids, and the Latest Ideas about the Origins of the Universe. Pantheon, 2001, 
 
 The Origin of the Universe: To the Edge of Space and Time
 The Universe That Discovered Itself
The Artful Universe Expanded 2005.
 The World Within the World
 Theories of Everything: The Quest for Ultimate Explanation
 The Constants of Nature: The Numbers that Encode the Deepest Secrets of the Universe. 2003, 
2007 New Theories of Everything. Pantheon,  
 Cosmic Imagery: Key Images in the History of Science.  The Bodley Head, 2008, 
 100 Essential Things You Didn't Know You Didn't Know: Math Explains Your World. W. W. Norton, 2008, 
 The Book of Universes: Exploring the Limits of the Cosmos. W. W. Norton, 2011, 
 Mathletics: A Scientist Explains 100 Amazing Things About The World of Sports. W. W. Norton, 2012, 
 100 Essential Things You Didn't Know You Didn't Know About Maths and the Arts. Bodley Head, 2014, 

In other languages:
 All Barrow's books for general readers have been re-published in Italy.

As editor:
Water and Life: The Unique Properties of H2O.  (ed., with Ruth M. Lynden-Bell, Simon Conway Morris, John L. Finney, Charles Harper, Jr.) CRC Press, 2010. 
Fitness of the Cosmos for Life: Biochemistry and Fine-Tuning. (eds., with S. Conway Morris, S.J. Freeland, and C.L. Harper), Cambridge UP, 2007. 
Science and Ultimate Reality: Quantum Theory, Cosmology and Complexity, 90th Birthday Volume for John Archibald Wheeler, (ed., with P.C.W. Davies, & C. Harper), Cambridge UP, 2004. 
The Physical Universe:  The Interface Between Cosmology, Astrophysics and Particle Physics, (ed., with A Henriques, M Lago, Malcolm Longair), Springer-Verlag, 1991.

References

External links

 

1952 births
2020 deaths
20th-century British physicists
British cosmologists
English science writers
Fellows of the Royal Society
Fellows of Clare Hall, Cambridge
Cambridge mathematicians
Alumni of Van Mildert College, Durham
Alumni of Magdalen College, Oxford
Members of the International Society for Science and Religion
Templeton Prize laureates
English Presbyterians
Philosophical cosmologists
Professors of Gresham College
Theoretical physicists
English male non-fiction writers
Recipients of the Gold Medal of the Royal Astronomical Society
Deaths from colorectal cancer
Deaths from cancer in England
21st-century British physicists